
This is a list of aircraft beginning with 'Tr'.

Tr

Trago Mills 
(Trago Mills Ltd (Aircraft Division))
 Trago Mills SAH-1

Trainair 
(Trainair Mfg Co, 1610 Sutter St, San Francisco, CA)
 Trainair Arab Junior

Trans-Florida 
(Trans-Florida Aviation Inc (pres: David Lindsay), Sarasota, FL)
 Trans-Florida Executive Mustang
 Trans-Florida Cavalier 750
 Trans-Florida Cavalier 1200
 Trans-Florida Cavalier 1500
 Trans-Florida Cavalier 2000
 Trans-Florida Cavalier 2500

Transall 
(International - Transport Allianz)
 Transall C-160

Transavia Corporation 
 Transavia Airtruk
 Transavia Skyfarmer

Transcend
(Transcend Air)
 Transcend Air Vy 400

Transcendental 
(Transcendental Aircraft Corp (founders: Mario A Guerrieri, Robert Lichten, former Piaseski personnel), Glen Riddle, PA and New Castle, DE)
 Transcendental 1-G
 Transcendental 2

Transland 
(Transland Co, Torrance, CA)
 Transland Ag-2
 Transland HU-16B

Trautman 
(Herbert Trautman)
 Trautman Road Air

Travel Air 
(Travel Air Mfg Co (founders: Walter Beech, Clyde Cessna, Lloyd Stearman, Pres: Walter P Innes Jr), 471 W First St, Wichita, KS)
 Travel Air 4-D
 Travel Air 4-S
 Travel Air 4-P
 Travel Air 4-U
 Travel Air 6-B
 Travel Air 10-B
 Travel Air 10-D
 Travel Air 11
 Travel Air 12
 Travel Air 14
 Travel Air 16
 Travel Air 1000
 Travel Air 2000
 Travel Air 3000
 Travel Air 4000
 Travel Air 5000
 Travel Air 6000
 Travel Air 7000
 Travel Air 8000
 Travel Air 9000
 Travel Air A
 Travel Air A-4E
 Travel Air D-4-D
 Travel Air Type R Mystery Ship
 Travel Air W-4-B
 Travel Air Z-4-D

Treadwell 
(Walter L Treadwell, Walnut Creek, CA)
 Treadwell Alley Cat

Trébucien 
(Jean Trébucien)
 Trébucien Sport

Trecker 
(Trecker Aircraft Corp (Pres: F J Trecker), Milwaukee, WI)
 Trecker Gull

Trefethen 
(Alfred Trefethen, Lomita, CA)
 Trefethen Sport-Aire II aka TT-1
 Trefethen TRW Special

Treffinger 
(Edward Y Treffinger, Santa Monica, CA)
 Treffinger T-1-HD

Trek Aerospace 
(Trek Aerospace Inc, Folsom, CA)
 Trek Aerospace Dragonfly

Trekking Parapentes
(Saint-Mathieu-de-Tréviers, France)
Trekking B-Bus
Trekking Carver
Trekking Elise
Trekking Just One
Trekking K2
Trekking Sebring
Trekking Senso
Trekking Sport
Trekking Trek
Trekking Xenos

Trella 
( (Frank, Fred, George, Henry & Joe) Trella Aircraft, 1269 E Grand Blvd, Detroit, MI)
 Trella Speedster T-17
 Trella T-19
 Trella T-100
 Trella T-101 Speedster
 Trella T-102
 Trella T-103
 Trella T-104
 Trella T-105
 Trella T-106
 Trella T-107

Tremaine 
(Pacific Aircraft Co (Fdr: William D Tremaine), Brea, CA)
 Tremaine Humming Bird
 Tremaine WT-2

Trendak
(Aviation Artur Trendak, Kolonia, Poland)
 Trendak Tercel
 Trendak Taurus
 Trendak Twistair
 Trendak T6
 Trendak Taifun

Trésy 
 Trésy TG-01

Triavio
(Triavio SRL, Catania, Italy)
Triavio Italo

Trio-Twister
(Eichwalde, Germany)
Trio-Twister 103
Trio-Twister 203

Tri-R 
(Tri-R Technologies, Oxnard, CA)
 Tri-R Kis
 Tri-R TR-4 Cruiser

Tridair 
(Tridair Helicopters Inc.)
 Tridair Gemini ST

Trident 
(Trident Aircraft Corp (founders: Chuck Herbst, Percy Spencer) Vancouver, British Columbia, Canada)
 Trident TR-1 Trigull

TrikeBuggy
(TrikeBuggy Inc, Santa Barbara, CA)
TrikeBuggy Delta

Trike Icaros
(Trike Icaros Industria Aeronautica Ltda, São Paulo, Brazil)
Trike Icaros Adventure S

Trimmer 
(Gilbert Trimmer, New York, NY)
 Trimmer Trimcraft

Trimouille 
(Jean-Pierre Trimouille, France)
Trimouille JT.IX
Trimouille JT.X
Trimouille JT.XI

Triton 
(Triton Aircraft Co, Sausalito, CA)
 Triton Water Sprite

Trixy 
(Trixy Aviation Products GmbH, Dornbirn, Austria)
 Trixy G 4-2 R
 Trixy Zero
 Trixy Trixformer
 Trixy Princess
 Trixy Liberty
 Trixy Spirit

Trommer-Michael
 Trommer-Michael T.M.4 Silbermöwe

Trotter 
(Larry G Trotter, Auburn, WA)
 Trotter WSA-1

Troy 
(Troy Air Service (George B Cluett II, Guy A Ham, Edward Pattison), Falmouth Airport, Hatchville, MA)
 Troy A

Troyer 
(Kermit R Troyer, Comstock, MI)
 Troyer VX

True 
(Roy True, Monroe, WI)
 True Sport

Truman 
(John R Truman, Bandon, OR)
 Truman 33

Trump 
(Frederick L Trump, Newcastle, DE)
 Trump Model 1

TRW 
(Thompson Ramo Wooldridge Inc)
 TRW RQ-5 Hunter

References

 List of aircraft (T)